Cleveland Middle School  may refer to:

 Elizabeth Cleveland Intermediate School a.k.a. Elizabeth Cleveland Middle School, Detroit, Michigan
 Cleveland Middle School, Cleveland Independent School District, Cleveland, Texas

See also
 Cleveland School (disambiguation)